Noi due soli (We Two Alone) is a 1952 Italian comedy film directed by Marcello Marchesi, Vittorio Metz and Marino Girolami.

Plot

Cast
 Walter Chiari as Walter 
 Hélène Rémy as  Gina 
 Carlo Campanini as Carlo 
 Anna Campori as Miss Fillide 
 Raimondo Vianello as  Vallini 
 Enrico Viarisio as President 
 Gianrico Tedeschi as "Muscle"
 Mario Feliciani
Delia Scala

External links
 

1952 films
Films scored by Nino Rota
1950s Italian-language films
Films directed by Marino Girolami
Italian comedy films
1952 comedy films
Italian black-and-white films
1950s Italian films